Sanjiban Ghosh (born 6 July 1991) is an Indian professional footballer who plays as a goalkeeper for Real Kashmir in the I-League.

Career
Born in Andul, West Bengal, Ghosh began his career with Southern Samity before going on trial with Mumbai. He was soon signed by the club. He made his professional debut for the club on 6 October 2012 in the opening game of the season against Pailan Arrows. He started and played the whole match as Mumbai lost 3–2.

Delhi Dynamos (loans)
On 4 October 2015, following injuries to Subhasish Roy Chowdhury and Ravi Kumar, Ghosh, along with Ishan Debnath, was signed by Delhi Dynamos of the Indian Super League on emergency loan. Ghosh made his debut for Delhi Dynamos that same day in their opening match of the season against Goa. He conceded twice as Delhi Dynamos lost 2–0.

On 23 May 2016, Ghosh was retained by Delhi Dynamos for the 2016 ISL season.

Jamshedpur
On 23 July 2017, Ghosh was selected in the 10th round of the 2017–18 ISL Players Draft by Jamshedpur for the 2017–18 Indian Super League season. He made his debut for the club on 4 March 2018 in their final match of the season against Goa. He came on as a 9th-minute substitute for Bikash Jairu after the starting goalkeeper, Subrata Pal, was sent off. He would go on to concede three goals as Goa won 3–0.

Ghosh then earned the Hero of the Match award after he helped Jamshedpur secure a victory via penalties in their Super Cup first round match against Minerva Punjab. He started the match and also saved two close range shots during second half of extra time to help maintain the 0–0 scoreline. During penalties, saved three shots as Jamshedpur won 5–4.

NorthEast United
In 2020, Ghosh was signed by NorthEast United FC on a two-years deal.

Real Kashmir
In September 2022, Ghosh signed for I-League club Real Kashmir, on a one-year deal.

International
In October 2015, Ghosh was called up to the India squad.

Career statistics

Club

References

External links 
 Indian Super League Profile

1991 births
Living people
Indian footballers
Mumbai FC players
Odisha FC players
Chennaiyin FC players
Jamshedpur FC players
Association football goalkeepers
Footballers from West Bengal
I-League players
Indian Super League players
Southern Samity players
NorthEast United FC players
Real Kashmir FC players